Malebo  is an unbounded neighbourhood in the locality of Euberta in the central east part of the Riverina.  It is situated by road, about 10 km west of Wagga Wagga and 16 km east of Millwood.

Malebo has no public buildings nor signage other than the prominent Malebo Shooting Range sign on the ridge of Malebo hill.

Malebo Post Office opened on 16 August 1888 and closed in 1912. It had a hotel.

References

Towns in the Riverina
Towns in New South Wales